Elm Park is an unincorporated community in Tomlinson Township, Scott County, Arkansas, United States. It is located on U.S. Highway 71, with Arkansas Highway 23 running north and Arkansas Highway 378 running west from the community.

History
The first permanent settlement at Elm Park was made in the 1840s.

References

Unincorporated communities in Scott County, Arkansas
Unincorporated communities in Arkansas